Plectrohyla quecchi is a species of frog in the family Hylidae.
It is endemic to Guatemala.
Its natural habitats are subtropical or tropical moist lowland forests, subtropical or tropical moist montane forests, and rivers.
It is threatened by habitat loss.

References

Plectrohyla
Endemic fauna of Guatemala
Amphibians of Guatemala
Amphibians described in 1942
Taxonomy articles created by Polbot